Koshekhablsky District is an administrative and a municipal district (raion), one of the seven in the Republic of Adygea, Russia. It is located in the east of the republic and borders with Kurganinsky District of Krasnodar Krai in the north and northeast, Labinsky District of Krasnodar Krai in the east, Mostovsky District of Krasnodar Krai in the south, Giaginsky District in the west, and with Shovgenovsky District in the northwest. Its administrative center is the rural locality (an aul) of Koshekhabl. As of the 2010 Census, the total population of the district was 30,422, with the population of Koshekhabl accounting for 23.8% of that number.

Etymology
The name "Koshekhablsky" is derived from the Circassian words "Kosho" (a Shapsug family name) and "Habl" (meaning neighborhood).

History
Koshekhablsky District was established within Azov-Black Sea Krai on December 31, 1934 as a result of the downsizing of the krai's districts. On December 7, 1956, the district was enlarged as portions of abolished Shovgenovsky District were merged into it. However, as the enlargement policy did not prove effective, the district was restored in its previous borders on March 21, 1958. On February 1, 1963, Koshekhablsky District was abolished and merged into newly created Shovgenovsky Rural District. As the new system of rural districts turned out to be inefficient as well, Koshekhablsky District was re-instated in its pre-1963 borders on January 12, 1965.

Administrative and municipal status
Within the framework of administrative divisions, Koshekhablsky District is one of the seven in the Republic of Adygea and has administrative jurisdiction over all of its twenty-four rural localities. As a municipal division, the district is incorporated as Koshekhablsky Municipal District. Its twenty-four rural localities are incorporated into nine rural settlements within the municipal district. The aul of Koshekhabl serves as the administrative center of both the administrative and municipal district.

Municipal composition
Blechepsinskoye Rural Settlement
Administrative center: aul of Blechepsin
Dmitriyevskoye Rural Settlement
Administrative center: settlement of Druzhba
other localities of the rural settlement:
settlement of Chekhrak, Dmitriyevskoye Rural Settlement
khutor of Dmitriyevsky
aul of Khachemziy
settlement of Komsomolsky
khutor of Krasny Fars
khutor of Novoalexeyevsky
khutor of Otradny
settlement of Plodopitomnik
khutor of Politotdel
Ignatyevskoye Rural Settlement
Administrative center: khutor of Ignatyevsky
Khodzinskoye Rural Settlement
Administrative center: aul of Khodz
Koshekhablskoye Rural Settlement
Administrative center: aul of Koshekhabl
Mayskoye Rural Settlement
Administrative center: settlement of Maysky
other localities of the rural settlement:
khutor of Chekhrak, Mayskoye Rural Settlement
khutor of Krasny
Natyrbovskoye Rural Settlement
Administrative center: selo of Natyrbovo
other localities of the rural settlement:
khutor of Kazyonno-Kuzhorsky
Volnenskoye Rural Settlement
Administrative center: selo of Volnoye
other localities of the rural settlement:
khutor of Karmolino-Gidroitsky
khutor of Shelkovnikov
Egerukhayskoye Rural Settlement
Administrative center: aul of Egerukhay
other localities of the rural settlement:
khutor of Sokolov

References

Notes

Sources

Districts of Adygea
 
States and territories established in 1934
States and territories disestablished in 1963
States and territories established in 1965
1934 establishments in the Soviet Union
1965 establishments in the Soviet Union